John William "Jack" King (February 12, 1931 – June 11, 2015) was Chief of Public Information and a Public Affairs Officer for NASA. He is best known for his work as Kennedy Space Center Chief of Public Information during projects Mercury, Gemini and Apollo. As part of this role, he provided public announcements and commentary for several of the mission launches. He is best known for his announcement of the Apollo 11 launch, which earned him the nickname "Voice of Apollo". The well-known commentary from that launch has been reused in songs and advertisements, and was included in a 2011 collection of NASA sounds from historic spaceflights that can be used as ringtones.

Career
King grew up in Boston, the son of a local sportswriter, and attended Boston College. Prior to joining NASA, King worked for the Associated Press. He opened the AP's Cape Canaveral bureau in 1958, when he was 27 years old. King joined NASA in 1960, and served as the Kennedy Space Center's Chief of Public Information from 1960 to 1971, and as NASA's Public Affairs Officer from 1971 to 1975.

After NASA, he spent two years as Director of Public Affairs for the U.S. Energy Research and Development Administration (later part of the United States Department of Energy), and another 15 years as executive vice president of Occidental Petroleum. He was appointed director of communications at the Fuqua School of Business in 1993. In 1997, King returned to Cape Canaveral and the U.S. manned space program, joining the United Space Alliance, where he served as spokesman.

King officially retired in October 2010, but continued to serve as a volunteer public affairs officer for NASA.

Sampling in music
The notable line of "...20 seconds and counting..." and "... Five, four, three, two, one, zero. All engine running. Lift off, we have a lift off" from the Apollo 11 launch has been used in songs like Lift Off by Kanye West & Jay-Z,  and on other works for projects from acts like Def Leppard's Hysteria. The phrase "31 seconds" is a motif in the influential jungle track "Valley of the Shadows" by Origin Unknown.

Personal life

King was a widower, his wife Evelyn having died in 2005. They were married 39 years. He had three children and five grandchildren. He was a Catholic.

King died on June 11, 2015, at the age of 84 of congestive heart failure.

References

Bibliography

External links

 
 
   2012 Interview with King (4m, 38s).
 King's Apollo 11 liftoff commentary (audio)
  (video)
 

NASA people
2015 deaths
1931 births
Boston College alumni
People from Boston
Catholics from Massachusetts
Duke University staff
Recipients of the NASA Distinguished Service Medal